Maricica Puică (née Luca on 29 July 1950) is a retired Romanian middle-distance runner. She is the 1984 Olympic champion in the 3000 metres. One of the greatest female middle-distance runners of the 1980s, she also twice won the World Cross Country Championship (1982, 1984) and broke the world record for the mile in 1982.

Career
Puicǎ was born in Iași, Romania and competed at the 1976 Montreal Olympics and the 1980 Moscow Olympics, where she finished seventh in the 1500 m. In 1978, she placed fourth in the 3000 m at the European Championships. In March 1982, she won the IAAF World Cross Country Championships. In August, she won a silver medal in the 3000 m at the European Championships behind Svetlana Ulmasova. She also finished fourth in the 1500 m final. A month later in September, she broke Mary Decker's world mile record of 4:18.08 with 4:17.44 in Rieti.

Puicǎ missed the 1983 World Championships due to injury, but returned in early 1984 to win her second World Cross Country Championship title. Then in the Summer, she won the inaugural 3000 m title at the 1984 Los Angeles Olympics, a race remembered more for the collision of Mary Decker and Zola Budd. At those Games, she also won a bronze medal in the 1500 m behind Italy's Gabriella Dorio and Romanian teammate Doina Melinte.

In July 1986, at the London Grand Prix, she broke Tatyana Kazankina's world 2000 m record of 5:28.72, with a time of 5:28.69. At the 1986 European Championships in Stuttgart, she won a silver medal in the 3000 m, behind Olga Bondarenko. She was also fifth in the 1500 m final. 1987 began with her winning a bronze medal in the 3000 m at the World Indoor Championships in Indianapolis, finishing behind the Soviet pair of Tatyana Samolenko and Bondarenko. Later that year, aged 37, she won a silver medal in the 3000 m at the World Championships in Rome, again behind Samolenko.

Puica competed at her fourth and final Olympic Games in Seoul 1988, where she dropped out of her 3000 m heat with just 200 metres to go.

In 1989, she spoke on Romanian television in support of the revolutionaries fighting against the regime of Nicolae Ceauşescu.
(However Nicolae Ceauşescu ignored the Soviet Union boycott of the 1984 Olympics in Los Angeles, in contrast to the other East European countries.)

International competitions

References

1950 births
Living people
Sportspeople from Iași
Romanian female middle-distance runners
Olympic athletes of Romania
Olympic gold medalists for Romania
Olympic bronze medalists for Romania
Athletes (track and field) at the 1976 Summer Olympics
Athletes (track and field) at the 1980 Summer Olympics
Athletes (track and field) at the 1984 Summer Olympics
Athletes (track and field) at the 1988 Summer Olympics
World Athletics Championships athletes for Romania
World Athletics Championships medalists
European Athletics Championships medalists
World Athletics Cross Country Championships winners
World record holders in masters athletics
World record setters in athletics (track and field)
Medalists at the 1984 Summer Olympics
Olympic gold medalists in athletics (track and field)
Olympic bronze medalists in athletics (track and field)
Universiade medalists in athletics (track and field)
Romanian female cross country runners
Universiade bronze medalists for Romania
World Athletics Indoor Championships medalists
Medalists at the 1977 Summer Universiade